Forwood Preserve is a nature preserve in northern Delaware near Lynnfield, Delaware. It includes old growth Forrest and has a branch of Stoney Creek (Delaware River tributary in Delaware) in it called Jacksons Creek (Delaware). It is 11 acres and is surrounded by mostly suburban development. It has one connection to Carcroft Crest Park near Stony Run Drive. 

The Forwoods were a prominent family that settled in Delaware. The preserve property was slated for development until neighbors rallied to save it in 1968.

The preserve has lots of mature trees with a mixture of deciduous and evergreen trees. Some tree species include eastern white pine, Norway spruce, American holly, eastern hemlock, pitch pine, eastern red cedar, red maple, white oak, northern red oak, swamp oak, American beech, American sycamore, and river birch.

History
The property has a long history and was formerly known as the Allen Tract. The Friends of Forwood Preserve is an organization working to preserve and protect the area.

Pictures

References

Protected areas of Delaware